Cobb and Frost was an American architectural firm. Cobb and Frost was founded in Chicago, Illinois by Henry Ives Cobb and Charles Sumner Frost in 1882. The firm was dissolved in 1889 when Cobb began work on designing the Newberry Library. Their most famous building was the Palmer Mansion, designed for Chicago industrialist Potter Palmer.

Selected buildings
Palmer Mansion, 1882
Chicago & North Western Railway Station, Oshkosh, Wisconsin, 1884
Chicago Opera House, 1884-5
Chicago & Alton Railway Station, Dwight, Illinois, 1885
Cable House, 1886
 Chicago & North Western Railway Station, Kenosha, Wisconsin, 1887 
 Harriet F. Rees House, 1888 
Dearborn Observatory, 1888
Union Depot, 201 South Main Street, Leavenworth, Kansas, 1888
Chicago & North Western Railway Station, Wheaton, Illinois

References

Defunct architecture firms based in Chicago